Rose Franco (born January 22, 1934) is a retired United States Marine Corps Warrant Officer. Originally from Puerto Rico, she is the first Hispanic woman to become a chief warrant officer in the U.S. Marine Corps.

Early life and education

Franco was born and raised in the barrio Ensenada of Guánica, Puerto Rico, which is located close to the "Bahia de Guánica" (Guánica Bay) in the southwest part of Puerto Rico. Franco, who was born into a poor family, was able to finish her primary and secondary education. Franco  went to college for a brief period of time, where she took classes in business administration.

Career
With the outbreak of the Korean War, Franco surprised her family by announcing that she was leaving college to join the United States Marine Corps. Her family protested, because they believed that a women's destiny was to get married and to raise a family as a housewife. Franco, however had her own ideas and felt that it was her patriotic duty to serve in the armed forces. On February 8, 1952, at the age of 20, Franco enlisted and was sent to Camp Lejeune in North Carolina where she underwent basic training. Upon graduation, she was sent to Camp Lejeune for advanced training. After finishing her advanced training, Franco was assigned to the duties of administrative supply assistant at Camp Pendleton in California.

In 1956, she completed her four-year enlistment and returned to Puerto Rico where she went to work for Pan American Airlines.  She found her office job in the airline boring and soon she re-enlisted in the Marines. She was assigned to the First Marine Corps District in Garden City, Long Island, New York. During the night she attended Long Island University. After two years there, she was sent to work as an administrator at Marine Corps Recruit Depot Parris Island in Parris Island, South Carolina.

Administrative Assistant to the Secretary of the Navy
In 1965, Franco was named Administrative Assistant to the Secretary of the Navy, Paul Henry Nitze by the administration of President Lyndon B. Johnson. She was promoted to the rank of Warrant Officer by the recommendation of the Secretary of the Navy.  She reported to work in The Pentagon in Washington, D.C. At that time, she was only one of 11 women Warrant Officers in the Marine Corps. Franco held various important positions in The Pentagon during her career.

Franco retired from the Marine Corps in 1977 with the rank of Chief Warrant Officer 3 and returned to Puerto Rico where she currently lives.

Awards and decorations
 

Badges:
   Office of the Secretary of Defense Identification Badge

See also

List of Puerto Ricans
List of Puerto Rican military personnel
Puerto Rican women in the military
Hispanics in the United States Marine Corps
History of women in Puerto Rico

References

Further reading
Puertorriquenos Who Served With Guts, Glory, and Honor. Fighting to Defend a Nation Not Completely Their Own; by : Greg Boudonck;

External links
 Women's Memorial

1934 births
Living people
People from Guánica, Puerto Rico
Puerto Rican United States Marines
United States Marine Corps officers
Female United States Marine Corps personnel
Puerto Rican military officers
Puerto Rican women in the military
United States Marines